Irvin Alberto Guerrero Hylton (born 26 April 1984) in Honduras is a footballer who currently plays as a defender for Platense in the Liga Nacional de Fútbol de Honduras.

Club career
Guerrero played for Platense and Real Juventud.

Deportes Savio
In 2010, he signed for LINA club Deportes Savio. He joined Vida for the 2012 Clausura.

International career
Guerrero made his debut for Honduras in a November 2011 friendly match against Serbia, his only cap so far.

References

External links

1989 births
Living people
People from Colón Department (Honduras)
Association football defenders
Honduran footballers
Honduras international footballers
Platense F.C. players
C.D. Real Juventud players
Deportes Savio players
C.D.S. Vida players
Liga Nacional de Fútbol Profesional de Honduras players